The Imperial Guards of the Qing dynasty were a select detachment of Manchu and Mongol bannermen responsible for guarding the Forbidden City in Beijing, the emperor, and the emperor's family. The Imperial Guards were divided into three groups: the Guard Corps, the Vanguard, and the Imperial Bodyguard.

Guard Corps 
The Guard Corps (Manchu: bayara) was assigned to protect the imperial palace. Soldiers from the Manchu and Mongol banners would be admitted to serve in the unit. The Guard corps was about ten times the size of the Vanguard and Imperial Bodyguards, and was the largest formation of the Imperial Guards.

Vanguard 
The Vanguard (Manchu: gabsihiyan) corps was assigned to march ahead of the emperor when he left the palace. Soldiers from the Manchu and Mongol banners could join. The Vanguard consisted of about 1500 men.

Imperial Bodyguard 
The Imperial Bodyguard (Manchu: hiya) corps was assigned to protect the emperor at all times. Only Manchu bannermen could join, and most members came from the upper three banners. Like the Vanguard, the Imperial Bodyguard consisted of about 1500 men.

See also 
Manchukuo Imperial Guards
Imperial Guards (Tang dynasty)
Shuai jiao
Wu Chien-ch'uan
Wu Quanyou
Yang Luchan

References

Citations

Sources 

 
 

Former guards regiments
Military history of the Qing dynasty
Chinese ceremonial units
Royal guards
Military units and formations of the Qing dynasty